Beowulf is the official soundtrack release for the film of the same name. It contains selections of music from the motion picture which was composed and conducted by composer Alan Silvestri. The album was released on November 20, 2007 from Warner Bros. Records.

Track listing

Score Credits
Music Composed and Conducted by: Alan Silvestri
Score Produced by: Alan Silvestri and David Bifano
Orchestrated by: John Ashton-Thomas and Alan Silvestri
Music Performed by: The Hollywood Studio Symphony
Score Contracted by: Sandy DeCrescent and Peter Rotter
Choir Performed by: Page LA Studio Voices and Hollywood Film Chorale
Vocal Contracting: Bobbi Page and Sally Stevens
Score Coordination: David Bifano
Score Preparation: JoAnn Kane Music Services
Recorded and Mixed by: Dennis Sands
Digital Recording by: Erik Swanson
Recordists: Tom Hardisty and Adam Olmsted
Score Recorded at: Todd-AO Scoring Stage
Music Editor: Ryan Rubin
Assistant Music Editor: Jeannie Marks
Supervising Music Editor: Kenneth Karman

Instrumentation
 Strings: 28 violins, 12 violas, 10 violoncellos, 8 double basses
 Woodwinds: 3 flutes, 3 oboes, 3 clarinets, 3 bassoons
 Brass: 8 French horns, 4 trumpets, 4 trombones, 2 tubas
 Percussion: 7 players
 2 harps, 2 pianos
 Choir: 38 singers

Songs Credits

Tracks 3, 7, 17
Written and Produced by: Glen Ballard and Alan Silvestri
Strings Arranged and Conducted by: Alan Silvestri
Recorded by: Scott Campbell
Additional Engineer: Bill Malina
Mixed by: Scott Campbell at Pacifique Studios, Hollywood CA
Contractor for Glen Ballard: Jolie Levine
Aerowave Coordinators: Stephanie Kubiak and Angela Vicari
Recorded at: The High Window, Hollywood CA

"A Hero Comes Home" (End Credits Version)
Performed by: Idina Menzel
Guitar: Tim Pierce
Drums: Blair Sinta
Programming, Keys and Guitar: Glen Ballard

Soundtrack Album Credits
Album Mastered by Stephen Marcussen at Marcussen Mastering
Score Published by Paramount Allegra Music (ASCAP)

External links
 Beowulf Soundtrack site

Albums produced by Glen Ballard
2007 soundtrack albums
Alan Silvestri soundtracks
Fantasy film soundtracks
Action film soundtracks